Virginia Yrun is a former member of the Arizona State Senate. She served in the Senate from April 2001 until January 2003. She was appointed to the seat vacated upon the death of Andy Nichols on April 19, 2001.  She assumed the seat a week later on April 26.

References

Democratic Party Arizona state senators
Women state legislators in Arizona